Medal of the Académie des lettres du Québec is an award granted by the Académie des lettres du Québec to a writer for the body of his or her work or to a personality in cultural life.

List of award recipients

1946 - Gabrielle Roy
1947 - Germaine Guèvremont
1958 - Raymond Barbeau
1959 - Jean Bruchési
1961 - Paul Morin
1962 - Pierre Daviault
1963 - Geneviève Massignon
1967 - Robert de Roquebrune
1974 - Gilles Marcotte
1980 - Séraphin Marion
1984 - Anne Hébert
1985 - Luc Lacourcière
1986 - Marcel Dubé
1987 - Félix Leclerc
1988 - Gratien Gélinas
1989 - Paul Beaulieu
1990 - Gaston Miron
1991 - Réginald Martel
1992 - Gilles Vigneault
1993 - Maurice Lemire
1994 - Maryvonne Kendergi
1995 - Roland Giguère
1996 - Jean-Marc Léger
1997 - Marie-Éva de Villers
1998 - Lise Bissonnette
1999 - Claire Martin
2000 - Gaston Bellemare
2003 - Jacques Lacoursière
2004 - Yvan Lamonde
2005 - André Vanasse
2006 - Françoise Sullivan
2007 - Jacques Godbout
2008 - Pierre Vadeboncœur
2009 - Jean-Jacques Nattiez
2010 - Fernand Ouellet
2011 - François Ricard
2012 - Robert Lepage
2013 - François-Marc Gagnon
2014 - Gaëtan Dostie
2015 - Patricia Smart
2016 - Jacques Brault

External links
  [French only]

Awards established in 1946
Culture of Quebec
Quebec awards
Quebec-related lists